C. elegantissima may refer to:
 Cladiella elegantissima, a species of corals
 Chithramia elegantissima, a species of fungi
 Clione elegantissima, a species of gastropods